Theodorus Engelbertus "Tjerk" Westerterp (born 2 December 1930) is a retired Dutch politician and diplomat of the defunct Catholic People's Party (KVP) now merged into the Christian Democratic Appeal (CDA) party and businessman.

Westerterp attended a Gymnasium in Rotterdam from April 1943 until May 1949 and applied at the Radboud University Nijmegen in June 1949 majoring in Political science obtaining a Bachelor of Social Science degree in 1951 before switching to Journalism and graduating with a Master of Arts degree in Journalism in July 1953. Westerterp worked as a journalist and editor for the De Maasbode from June 1949 until July 1953. Westerterp as a civil servant for the European Coal and Steel Community (ECSC) in Luxembourg City from July 1953 until July 1963.

Westerterp became a Member of the House of Representatives after Gerard Veldkamp was appointed as Minister of Social Affairs and Health in the Cabinet Marijnen after the election of 1963, taking office on 31 July 1963 serving as a frontbencher chairing the special parliamentary committee for Academic degrees and spokesperson for European Affairs, Benelux, Transport, Aviation and deputy spokesperson for Foreign Affairs and NATO. Westerterp was selected as a Member of the European Parliament and dual served in those positions, taking office on 8 May 1967. He also served as Vice-President of the European Parliament from 9 March 1971 until 17 August 1971. After the election of 1971 Westerterp was appointed as State Secretary for Foreign Affairs in the Cabinet Biesheuvel I, taking office on 17 August 1971. The Cabinet Biesheuvel I fell just one year later on 19 July 1972 and continued to serve in a demissionary capacity until the first cabinet formation of 1972 when it was replaced by the caretaker Cabinet Biesheuvel II with Westerterp continuing as State Secretary for Foreign Affairs, taking office on 9 August 1972. After the election of 1972 Westerterp returned as a Member of the House of Representatives, taking office on 7 December 1972 but he was still serving in the cabinet and because of dualism customs in the constitutional convention of Dutch politics he couldn't serve a dual mandate he subsequently resigned as State Secretary for Foreign Affairs on 7 March 1973. Following the second cabinet formation of 1972 Westerterp was appointed as Minister of Transport and Water Management in the Cabinet Den Uyl, taking office on 11 May 1973. The Cabinet Den Uyl fell on 22 March 1977 after four years of tensions in the coalition and continued to serve in a demissionary capacity. After the election of 1977 Westerterp again returned as a Member of the House of Representatives, taking office on 8 June 1977 but because of the dualism customs he resigned as Member of the House of Representatives on 8 September 1977. Following the cabinet formation of 1977 Westerterp was not giving a cabinet post in the new cabinet, the Cabinet Den Uyl was replaced by the Cabinet Van Agt-Wiegel on 19 December 1977 and he subsequently returned as a Member of the House of Representatives following the appointment of Til Gardeniers-Berendsen as Minister of Culture, Recreation and Social Work in the new cabinet, taking office on 22 December 1977 serving as a backbencher.

In January 1978 Westerterp was nominated as Chief executive officer (CEO) and Chairman of the Board of directors of the Amsterdam Stock Exchange, he resigned as a Member of the House of Representatives the same day he was installed as CEO and Chairman on 15 February 1978. Westerterp also became active in the private sector and public sector and occupied numerous seats as a corporate director and nonprofit director on several boards of directors and supervisory boards (DSB Bank, Radio Netherlands Worldwide, DSM Company, Van Lanschot, Atlantic Association, Randstad Holding and the Institute of International Relations Clingendael) and served on several state commissions and councils on behalf of the government (Public Pension Funds APB, Cadastre Agency and the Advisory Council for Foreign Affairs) and as an advocate and lobbyist for Highway engineering improvements and European integration and as a political consultant for the Livable Netherlands (LN) party.

Westerterp is known for his abilities as a manager and policy wonk.

Decorations

References

External links

  Drs. Th.E. (Tjerk) Westerterp Parlement & Politiek

1930 births
Living people
Businesspeople from Rotterdam
Van Lanschot Kempen people
Catholic People's Party MEPs
Catholic People's Party politicians
Christian Democratic Appeal politicians
Commanders of the Order of Orange-Nassau
Dutch chief executives in the finance industry
Dutch chief executives in the technology industry
Dutch corporate directors
Dutch expatriates in Belgium
Dutch expatriates in Luxembourg
Dutch lobbyists
Dutch nonprofit directors
Dutch nonprofit executives
Dutch people of Flemish descent
Dutch political consultants
Dutch political writers
Dutch Roman Catholics
Knights of the Holy Sepulchre
Livable Netherlands politicians
Members of the House of Representatives (Netherlands)
MEPs for the Netherlands 1958–1979
Ministers of Transport and Water Management of the Netherlands
Officers of the Order of Leopold II
People from Alphen-Chaam
People from Middelburg, Zeeland
Politicians from Rotterdam
Radboud University Nijmegen alumni
State Secretaries for Foreign Affairs of the Netherlands
20th-century Dutch businesspeople
20th-century Dutch civil servants
20th-century Dutch diplomats
20th-century Dutch journalists
20th-century Dutch male writers
20th-century Dutch politicians
21st-century Dutch businesspeople
21st-century Dutch male writers